The H.S. Mabry Barn is a historic barn in rural central Stone County, Arkansas.  It is located on the north side of County Road 21, south of Mountain View.  It is a large two-story wood-frame structure, built in a transverse crib plan with animal stalls flanking a central drive that parallels the ridge of the gabled roof.  Sheds extend the covered area on each of the long sides.  The barn was built c. 1922 by Albert Hubbler to house H. S. Mabry's mule herd, and is noted for its unusually large size.

It has a hay hood.

The barn was listed on the National Register of Historic Places in 1985.

See also
National Register of Historic Places listings in Stone County, Arkansas

Gallery

References

Barns on the National Register of Historic Places in Arkansas
Buildings and structures completed in 1922
Buildings and structures in Stone County, Arkansas
National Register of Historic Places in Stone County, Arkansas
Barns with hay hoods